Astrid Smeplass (born 29 October 1996) is a Norwegian singer and songwriter. In 2013, she placed fifth in the Norwegian version of Pop Idol, entitled Idol – Jakten på en superstjerne. In 2020, she released her debut studio album, Leave It Beautiful, through Universal.

Career 
16-year-old Smeplass released her first single "Shattered", which was co-written by American singer-songwriter Melanie Fontana, after participating in Idol - Jakten på en superstjerne in 2013. She signed a publishing deal with Sony ATV Music Publishing shortly after. Her first single under her new artist image, "2AM", was released through Universal Music in 2014, releasing in the US the following year. She also released a cover of the single "FourFiveSeconds" by Rihanna, Kanye West and Paul McCartney. In 2016, she released the song "Hurts So Good", which was included on her debut self-titled extended play, Astrid S. She also supported Troye Sivan on his European tour. The following year she released her second EP, Party's Over. In 2017, Smeplass provided backing vocals on "Hey Hey Hey" by American singer Katy Perry from her album Witness.

In 2017, Smeplass's cover of Cezinando's "Vi er perfekt, men verden er ikke det" was featured on the soundtrack of the fourth season of Skam and Smeplass performed it at the award ceremony P3 Gull the same year. On 30 June 2017, she released her second EP, Party's Over, which featured the singles "Breathe" and "Such a Boy". Two weeks later, an acoustic rendition of the EP was released, with an additional song entitled "Mexico". In September 2017, her single "Think Before I Talk" peaked at number 14 on the Swedish charts, where it was later certified platinum. It was also certified gold in Denmark, where it peaked at number nine. In February 2018, Smeplass was awarded Årets Spellemann (Artist of the Year) at the annual Spellemannsprisen, being the first female artist to do so since 2003. After the release of the song "Emotion", Smeplass joined Years & Years on their UK tour at the end of 2018, followed by her supporting Zara Larsson on her US tour in 2019. In April 2019, Astrid became the face of Fendi's F for Fendi campaign. She joined 16-year-old climate change activist Greta Thunberg for her Fridays For Future event in Sweden, performing a cover of "I Want to Know What Love Is" by Foreigner.

In August 2019, her fourth EP was released, entitled Trust Issues. The EP features previously released singles "Someone New", "Emotion" and "The First One", in addition to two new released; "Doing To Me" and "Trust Issues". Smeplass's first release of 2020 was "I Do", a collaboration with country singer Brett Young. The song peaked at number three in Norway. In September of the same year, Smeplass announced her debut studio album, Leave It Beautiful, which was released on 16 October 2020. It was preceded by the lead single "Dance Dance Dance", as well as the second and third singles, "Marilyn Monroe" and "It's Ok If You Forget Me". In 2021, she played the titular role in Tre nøtter til Askepott (Three nuts for Cinderella), a Norwegian remake of the 1973 Czechoslovak/East German film Tři oříšky pro Popelku, for which she also released the single "Når snøen smelter", her first original Norwegian-language song.

Discography

Studio albums

Extended plays

Singles

As lead artist 

Notes

As featured artist

Guest appearances

Other charted songs

Covers 
 "Undressed" – cover with Julie Bergan (2013) – Certified Platinum by IFPI NOR
 "FourFiveSeconds" – cover (2015)
"Vi er perfekt men verden er ikke det" – cover (2017) 

Notes
 A  "Breathe" did not chart on the NZ Top 40 Singles Chart, but peaked at 5 on the NZ Heatseekers Singles chart.
 B  "Such a Boy" did not chart on the NZ Top 40 Singles Chart, but peaked at 9 on the NZ Heatseekers Singles chart.

Filmography 
Television

Movies

Concert tours 
Headlining
 Party's Over World Tour (2017)
 World Tour Part_One (2020)

Supporting
 Troye Sivan – Blue Neighbourhood Tour (2016)
 Troye Sivan – Suburbia Tour (2016)
 Years & Years – Palo Santo Tour (2018)
 Zara Larsson – Don't Worry Bout Me Tour (2019)

Awards and nominations

References

External links 

 

1996 births
21st-century Norwegian singers
21st-century Norwegian women singers
English-language singers from Norway
Idol (Norwegian TV series) participants
Living people
Norwegian pop singers
Norwegian songwriters
Musicians from Rennebu
Synth-pop singers
Tropical house musicians